Élisabeth Haussard (1700 in Paris – 1804) was a French scientific illustrator and engraver.

Biography 
Élisabeth Haussard was born the youngest daughter of the family of engraver Jean-Baptiste Haussard. Along with her older sister Catherine, she took part in illustrating scientific and technical works, specialising in engraving legends and labels for geographical maps.

Her signature may take the form : « E Haussard », « El Haussard », « Elis haussard », « E. Haußard », etc.

Works 
Élisabeth Haussard partly illustrated the following works :

  with fifteen illustrated pages, two by Élisabeth Haussard.
  with 42 illustrated pages, including five by Élisabeth Haussard.
  with six illustrated pages, including one by Élisabeth Haussard.
  with 382 illustrated pages, including numbers 19 and 20 by Élisabeth Haussard.
  with 72 illustrated pages, including 7 by Élisabeth Haussard.

Gallery

References

18th-century French engravers
Women engravers
1700 births
1804 deaths